Peter Riesterer (* 10 September 1892; † 1979 (Age 87) was a Swiss footballer who played for FC Basel. He played mainly in the position of defender. 

Between the years 1913 and 1930 Riesterer played a total of 244 games for Basel, scoring a total of 9 goals. 149 of these games were in the Swiss Serie A, four in the Swiss Cup and 90 were friendly games. He scored six goals in the domestic league, the other three were scored during the test games.

References

Sources
 Rotblau: Jahrbuch Saison 2017/2018. Publisher: FC Basel Marketing AG. 
 Die ersten 125 Jahre. Publisher: Josef Zindel im Friedrich Reinhardt Verlag, Basel. 

 

FC Basel players
Swiss men's footballers
Association football defenders
1892 births
1979 deaths